Yemen does not have any permanent rivers, but does have numerous wadis, which is an either permanently or intermittently dry riverbed. This is a list of wadis in Yemen.
This list is arranged by drainage basin, with respective tributaries indented under each larger stream's name.

Red Sea (Tihamah)
Wadi Harad
Wadi Mawr
Wadi Akhraf
Wadi Haydan
Wadi Surdud
Wadi Siham
Wadi Rima
Wadi Zabid
Wadi Mawza
Wadi Bani Khawlan
Wadi De Nachib
wadi alwoja raimah

Gulf of Aden
Wadi Harim
Wadi Tuban
Wadi Bana
Wadi Hassan
Wadi Ahwar (Wadi Jurrah)
Wadi Milh (Wadi Ar Ruqub)
Wadi Mayfa‘ah
Wadi Amaqin
Wadi Hada
Wadi Hajr
Wadi Huwayrah
Wadi al Masilah
Wadi Hibun 
Wadi Hamir
Wadi Hayfari
Wadi Tabaqim
Wadi Sana
Wadi Adim
Wadi Hadramawt (Hadhramaut)
Wadi Sarr
Wadi Amd
Wadi al Jiz
Wadi Dawan (Dhahawn)
Wadi Kidyut
Wadi Mahrat
Wadi Tinhalin

Rub' al-Khali
Wadi Jawf
Wadi Raghwan
Wadi al Kharid
Wadi Abrad
Wadi as Sudd
Wadi Harib
Wadi Dumays
Wadi Bayhan
Wadi Markhah
Wadi Makhyah (Wadi as Sidarah)
Wadi Qinab
Wadi Aywat al Manahil
Wadi Armah
Wadi Dahyah
Wadi Arabah
Wadi Rakhawt
Wadi Mitan
Wadi Shihan
Wadi Hat

See also
List of wadis of Oman
Wildlife of Yemen

References

 
Yemen
Wadis